Kim Yong-mi (김용미; born 23 February 1976) is a track and road cyclist from South Korea. She represented her nation at the 1996 Summer Olympics on the road in the women's road race and on the track in the women's points race. At the 2004 Summer Olympics she competed also in the women's points race and got in 16th place She was the sole Koran Asian Games gold medalist in women's road cycling (2002 Busan Asian Games) until Na Ah-reum repeated the feat in the 2018 Jakarta Asian Games. She is currently the coach of the South Korean Samyang Corp women's cycling team as well being the occasional South Korean national women's team coach.

References

External links
 

South Korean female cyclists
Cyclists at the 1996 Summer Olympics
Cyclists at the 2004 Summer Olympics
Olympic cyclists of South Korea
Living people
Cyclists at the 1998 Asian Games
Cyclists at the 2002 Asian Games
1976 births
Asian Games medalists in cycling
Medalists at the 1998 Asian Games
Medalists at the 2002 Asian Games
Asian Games gold medalists for South Korea
Asian Games bronze medalists for South Korea
20th-century South Korean women
21st-century South Korean women